The London Government Act 1963 (c. 33) is an Act of the Parliament of the United Kingdom, which created Greater London and a new local government structure within it. The Act significantly reduced the number of local government districts in the area, resulting in local authorities responsible for larger areas and populations. The upper tier of local government was reformed to cover the whole of the Greater London area and with a more strategic role; and the split of functions between upper and lower tiers was recast. The Act classified the boroughs into inner and outer London groups. The City of London and its corporation were essentially unreformed by the legislation. Subsequent amendments to the Act have significantly amended the upper tier arrangements, with the Greater London Council abolished in 1986, and the Greater London Authority introduced in 2000. , the London boroughs are more or less identical to those created in 1965, although with some enhanced powers over services such as waste management and education.

Provisions of the Act
The Act set up a two-tier local government system, with powers divided between the newly formed Greater London Council (GLC), 32 new London borough councils and the existing City of London. The provisions of the Act came into effect on 1 April 1965, the new councils having been elected as "shadow authorities" in 1964.

Section 1 of the Act established 32 London boroughs, each of which was to be governed by an elected borough council, and was to be regulated by the Municipal Corporations Act 1882 and Local Government Act 1933. Twelve of the boroughs, corresponding to the former County of London, were designated Inner London boroughs. The remaining twenty boroughs were designated Outer London boroughs. None of the boroughs were given names in the Act.

Section 2 declared that the area comprising the areas of the London boroughs, the City and the Temples shall constitute an administrative area to be known as Greater London. An elected Greater London Council was to govern the new area.

Section 3 abolished the administrative counties of Middlesex and London (created in 1889), and absorbed parts of Kent, Essex, Surrey and Hertfordshire plus the whole of the City of London to form the administrative area of Greater London. As well as the two counties, the twenty-eight existing metropolitan boroughs, plus all county boroughs, county districts or parishes that fell wholly within Greater London were to cease to exist, along with their councils. No part of Greater London was to form part of any administrative county, county district or parish. Three Middlesex urban districts not included in Greater London were transferred to other counties: Potters Bar to Hertfordshire and Staines and Sunbury-on-Thames to Surrey.

The Act also established the Inner London Education Authority to administer schools and colleges in the 12 inner London boroughs. The remaining 20 outer boroughs became local education authorities in their own right. The London Traffic Area and the London and Home Counties Traffic Advisory Committee, set up in 1924, were abolished, with the GLC gaining powers to regulate road traffic. An alteration was also made to the Metropolitan Police District to include the whole of Greater London, but the district continued to include a number of areas in surrounding counties.

The boroughs

The composition of the London boroughs was given in Schedule 1 of the Act:

The metropolitan boroughs of Westminster, Paddington and St Marylebone.
The metropolitan boroughs of Hampstead, Holborn and St Pancras.
The metropolitan boroughs of Finsbury and Islington.
The metropolitan boroughs of Hackney, Shoreditch and Stoke Newington.
The metropolitan boroughs of Bethnal Green, Poplar and Stepney.
The metropolitan borough of Greenwich and so much of the metropolitan borough of Woolwich as lay south of the centre of the navigable channel of the River Thames at low water.
The metropolitan boroughs of Deptford and Lewisham.
The metropolitan boroughs of Bermondsey, Camberwell and Southwark.
The metropolitan borough of Lambeth and so much of the metropolitan borough of Wandsworth as lay east of Hazelbourne Road, Cavendish Road, the railway between Balham and Streatham Common stations and the railway between Streatham and Mitcham Junction stations.
The metropolitan borough of Battersea and the remainder of the metropolitan borough of Wandsworth not included in borough 9.
The metropolitan boroughs of Fulham and Hammersmith.
The metropolitan boroughs of Chelsea and Kensington
The boroughs of Chingford, Leyton and Walthamstow
The borough of Ilford, the borough of Wanstead and Woodford, so much of the borough of Dagenham as lay north of Billet Road and an area in the south of the urban district of Chigwell including the Hainault Estate.
The borough of Romford and the urban district of Hornchurch.
The borough of Barking except the part in Borough 17 and the borough of Dagenham except the part in Borough 14.
The county boroughs of East Ham and West Ham, so much of the borough of Barking as lay west of the River Roding and Barking Creek and the part of the metropolitan borough of Woolwich not included in Borough 6.
The boroughs of Bexley and Erith, the urban district of Crayford, and so much of the urban district of Chislehurst and Sidcup as lay north of the A20 road.
The boroughs of Beckenham and Bromley, the urban districts of Orpington and Penge, and so much of the urban district of Chislehurst and Sidcup as lay south of the A20 road.
The county borough of Croydon and the urban district of Coulsdon and Purley.
The borough of Beddington and Wallington, the borough of Sutton and Cheam and the urban district of Carshalton.
The boroughs of Mitcham and Wimbledon and the urban district of Merton and Morden.
The borough of Kingston upon Thames, the borough of Malden and Coombe and the borough of Surbiton.
The boroughs of Barnes, Richmond and Twickenham.
The borough of Brentford and Chiswick, the borough of Heston and Isleworth, and the urban district of Feltham.
The borough of Uxbridge, the urban district of Hayes and Harlington, the urban district of Ruislip-Northwood, and the urban district of Yiewsley and West Drayton.
The boroughs of Acton, Ealing and Southall.
The boroughs of Wembley and Willesden.
The borough of Harrow.
The boroughs of Finchley and Hendon, and the urban districts of Barnet, East Barnet and Friern Barnet.
The boroughs of Hornsey, Tottenham and Wood Green.
The boroughs of Edmonton, Enfield and Southgate.

Names
As passed, the Act did not include names for the new boroughs. Keith Joseph, the Minister, asked local councils for suggestions as to possible names, asking that they be a single word if possible, and noting that "the best name will be the place recognised as the centre of the new borough". Double-barrelled names were to be prohibited.

The 'Royal Borough of Charlton' was proposed for the Greenwich and Woolwich metropolitan boroughs.  Lewisham and Deptford were unable to agree on whether the borough should be named Lewisham, Deptford or after the central river/stream, Ravensbourne. The councils to become part of the London Borough of Barnet suggested "Northgate" or "Northern Heights" as names. Islington and Finsbury (Borough 3) were also unable to come to a decision, with Finsbury preferring "New River" and Islington preferring Islington. Richmond and Twickenham (Borough 24) disagreed over which, if any of those names should appear in the new borough names. Suggestions for Enfield (Borough 32) included "Enfield Chase" and "Edmonton Hundred".

Nine names were without controversy and were proposed in September 1963.
Westminster (Borough 1)
Camden (Borough 2) – "virtually in the centre of the three boroughs"
Tower Hamlets (Borough 5) – a historic alternative name for the Tower division of Middlesex
Redbridge (Borough 14) – named after a red bridge of the River Roding in Ilford
Newham (Borough 17) – combination of East Ham and West Ham
Croydon (Borough 20)
Kingston upon Thames (Borough 23)
Ealing (Borough 27)
Haringey (Borough 31) – a variant spelling of Harringay

Six new names were proposed by the Minister in October 1963 for boroughs unable to decide upon a name
Bexley (Borough 18)
Bromley (Borough 19)
Sutton (Borough 21)
Richmond upon Thames (Borough 24)
Hounslow (Borough 25)
Uxbridge (ultimately changed to Hillingdon) (Borough 26)

The Minister proposed a further twelve names in January 1964
Greenwich (not Charlton as previously suggested) (Borough 6)
Hillingdon (not Uxbridge) (Borough 26)
Islington (Borough 3)
Hackney (Borough 4)
Lewisham (Borough 7)
Southwark (Borough 8)
Wandsworth (Borough 10)
Kensington and Chelsea (Borough 12)
Waltham Forest (Borough 13)
Havering (Borough 15) – after the former Royal Liberty of Havering which covered a similar area
Barking (Borough 16)
Morden (Borough 22) (ultimately changed to Merton)
Barnet (Borough 30)
Enfield (Borough 32)
Wembley and Willesden (Borough 28) wished to be called "Willesden and Wembley", but was ultimately titled Brent after the River Brent.
Hammersmith and Fulham (Borough 11) were unable to choose a single name, and sent a shortlist to the Minister including "Riverside" and "Olympia".

Councillors for the Metropolitan Boroughs of Chelsea and Kensington were divided and opposed the loss of their two ancient parish names in combining, so the Minister for Housing and Local Government made one exception and the Royal Borough of Kensington and Chelsea came into being.

Distribution of functions
The split of functions between the new authorities were:

Background

Herbert Report

A royal commission was appointed in 1957 under the chairmanship of Sir Edwin Herbert to consider future local government structures in Greater London. The commission delivered its report in October 1960 proposing the creation of a Greater London with 52 Greater London Boroughs.

The Greater London area set up by the 1963 Act was very similar to that proposed by the Herbert Report but excluded Banstead, Caterham and Warlingham, Esher, Walton and Weybridge in Surrey, Chigwell in Essex, Cheshunt in Hertfordshire, and Staines and Sunbury in Middlesex.

Passage through Parliament
The government considered that the boroughs should be fewer and larger so published its plan for 34 London boroughs in late 1961. In the County of London this reorganised the proposed boroughs so that combinations for the present boroughs of Camden, Westminster and Islington were achieved. The Hackney borough had Shoreditch rather than the Tower Hamlets borough. Lewisham would be standalone, Deptford would combine with Camberwell and Bermondsey, and Southwark and Lambeth would unite. Eastern Wandsworth was to form a borough in itself, with western Wandsworth being paired with Battersea.

Outside the former County of London, the outer London boroughs were to be:

Chigwell (north of the Roding – that is, Loughton and Buckhurst Hill)/Chingford/Leyton/Walthamstow/Wanstead and Woodford
Chigwell (south of the Roding)/Ilford
Hornchurch (part)/Romford
Barking/Dagenham/Hornchurch (Rainham and South Hornchurch wards)
East Ham/West Ham/North Woolwich
Bexley/Chislehurst and Sidcup/Crayford/Erith
Beckenham/Bromley/Orpington/Penge
Caterham and Warlingham/Coulsdon and Purley/Croydon
Banstead/Beddington and Wallington/Carshalton/Epsom and Ewell/Sutton and Cheam
Merton and Morden/Mitcham/Wimbledon
Esher/Kingston/Malden and Coombe/Surbiton/Walton and Weybridge
Barnes/Richmond/Twickenham
Brentford and Chiswick/Feltham/Heston and Isleworth/Staines/Sunbury
Hayes and Harlington/Ruislip-Northwood/Uxbridge/Yiewsley and West Drayton
Acton/Ealing/Southall
Wembley/Willesden
Harrow
Barnet/Finchley/Hendon
East Barnet/Enfield (part)/Friern Barnet/Hornsey/Southgate/Wood Green
Cheshunt/Edmonton/Enfield (part)/Tottenham

The Minister of Housing and Local Government announced, on their request, that five urban districts (Cheshunt, Chigwell, Esher, Staines and Sunbury) were to be excluded from Greater London on 18 May 1961, having earlier confirmed the widely expected exclusion of Banstead, Caterham and Warlingham and Walton and Weybridge.

Requests from the councils of Romford, Barnet, Carshalton, Coulsdon and Purley, Feltham, Yiewsley and West Drayton to be removed from the area were turned down. Additionally, the department decided that the "northern part of the borough of Epsom and Ewell definitely forms part of Greater London and must be included". Epsom and Ewell would ultimately be excluded from the area in its entirety.

Changes published in August 1962 saw a reduction from 33 to 32 boroughs, and in greater detail, Shoreditch to join Hackney; Wanstead and Woodford to be added to Ilford to form 'Redbridge' rather than join Waltham Forest; Chislehurst and Sidcup to be divided between the Bromley and the Bexley; East Barnet, Friern Barnet, Hendon, and Finchley to form a single borough (Barnet), Enfield to join Edmonton and Southgate (to be simply Enfield), the Tottenham, Hornsey and Wood Green authorities to combine to form Haringey and at the most local level, Clapham and Streatham neighbourhoods to join Lambeth.

The slightly amended form was laid before Parliament for substantive debates from November 1962 until April 1963. This proposed the eventually settled 32 more empowered boroughs forming a new administrative county.

Support
Ministerial proponents of the Bill advanced its smooth passage summarising the Royal Commission's Report:

Opposition
The leaders and all members of the Opposition in both houses saw the Bill as being partisan, opposed London's re-casting and celebrated its predecessor:

Five Conservative MPs (for North-West Croydon, South Croydon, Carshalton, Wimbledon and East Surrey) sympathised with a petition from 20,000 to 30,000 people from Croydon and two hillside semi-rural towns not to join London. Former Labour Home Secretary James Chuter Ede, a retired Surrey magistrate and county councillor, co-led the opposition in Committee, having met residents who were all "resolutely and determinedly opposed to the Bill." He was instrumental in getting his own area, Epsom and Ewell, completely excluded. Charles Doughty, MP for East Surrey (including Coulsdon and Purley), prophesied that "A shotgun marriage of the kind proposed in the Bill between Coulsdon, Purley and [the Borough of] Croydon can never be successful...The affinities of Coulsdon and Purley go south, not to the north and east. This is a very bad part of the Bill."  The Bill passed, and the boundaries including this fusion, have lasted since 1 April 1965.

Subsequent amendments

Local Government Act 1972
The Local Government Act 1972 provided a mechanism for councils to change their names: the London Borough of Hammersmith and the London Borough of Barking changed their names after their creation to contain a second locality, to form the London Borough of Hammersmith and Fulham and the London Borough of Barking and Dagenham.

Local Government Act 1985
The Local Government Act 1985 abolished the Greater London Council and transferred its functions to the London borough councils, joint arrangements and to central government. The Inner London Education Authority continued to exist as a directly elected authority.

Education Reform Act 1988
The Education Reform Act 1988 abolished the Inner London Education Authority and made the inner London boroughs education authorities.

Greater London Authority Act 1999
The Greater London Authority Act 1999 created the Greater London Authority as a replacement for the Greater London Council.

References

External links 
Text of London Government Act 1963
London Boroughs map

United Kingdom Acts of Parliament 1963
1963 in London
Local government legislation in England and Wales
History of local government in London (1889–1965)
Acts of the Parliament of the United Kingdom concerning London
Mergers of administrative divisions